Paphiopedilum liemianum is a species of orchid endemic to northern Sumatra (Kg. Susuk). These plants were first collected in Gunong Sinabung in Sumatra by Liem Khe Wie, at 600–1,000 meters. The flowers are 8–9 cm across and sit on top of a 15–20 cm long inflorescence.

References

External links 

liemianum
Endemic orchids of Indonesia
Orchids of Sumatra